The SS Lawton B. Evans was an American military ship, constructed in Alabama during World War II it was named after the author Lawton Bryan Evans (1862–1934).

Construction

SS Lawton B. Evans was a Liberty ship, with hull number 'MCE 746'. She launched at Alabama Drydock and Shipbuilding Company on January 1, 1943, sponsored by Betty Jane Hard, Winner of Scrap Metal Drive, Milledgeville, Georgia. The cosponsor was Mrs. E. D. Veal, Principal of Midway School, Milledgeville, Georgia.

World War II
She was operated by the General Steamship Corporation under a charter with the Maritime Commission and War Shipping Administration.

U-boat encounter

During the Convoy HX 228 she was slightly damaged at 21.31 hours on March 10, 1943 when hit by a dud torpedo from German U-boat U-221 commanded by Hans-Hartwig Trojer. Out of the 22 ships hit by this German submarine SS Lawton B. Evans was the only one to survive.

Battle of Anzio

Liberty ships were United States Shipping Board cargo ships, a merchant ship, fitted with guns for defensive purposes manned by United States Navy Armed Guard. In one notable incident they were used for support from 22 to 30 January 1944 when the Lawton B. Evans was involved in the Battle of Anzio in Italy. First class seaman Calvin Stoddard O'Rourke received commendations for his performance on June 24, 1944 when this ship was under repeated bombardment from hostile shore batteries and aircraft throughout an eight-day period. Despite the prolonged danger of shrapnel, machine-gun fire and bombs, the gun crew fought back, setting up a deadly barrage of shellfire. They shot down five German planes and contributed to the success of the landing operations.

Incident at the end of WWII

Merchant mariner Lex Fanjoy from North Woburn, MA was a boatswain aboard SS Lawton B. Evans on August 10, 1945, when the vessel was anchored off the Anzio beachhead during a violent gale and electrical storm. The barrage balloon floated from the stern of the ship at the end of a 1,000 foot cable. This wire was anchored to a winch and it became heavily charged with static electricity that discharged near an open hatch containing gasoline in cans. Fanjoy volunteered to cut the balloon adrift. Disregarding the possibility of electrocution, a shock that might knock him down, or dismemberment from the whip of the released wire, boatswain Fanjoy went aloft and cut the line adrift. He received minor shocks and when he cut the wire he was stunned by an electrical discharge that knocked him into the crosstrees below, narrowly escaping death.

Scrapped
The ship was scrapped in Baltimore Harbor in Maryland in  1960.

In popular culture
The 2021 motion picture, The Rebels of PT-218, featured a Merchant Marine vessel named the SS Lawton B. Evans under the command of Lieutenant William Snow, played by Eric Roberts about the Battle of Anzio and PT-218.

References

1943 ships
Ships built in Mobile, Alabama
Liberty ships
Troop ships of the United States
World War II auxiliary ships of the United States